King of R&B is the second studio album by American singer-songwriter Jacquees. It was released on November 8, 2019, by Cash Money, Republic and Universal.

Background 
In 2018 Jacquees started to work on the album going for a direction that detached itself from the hip hop-influenced sound of his debut album, going for a pure R&B direction for an album that was supposed to be called Round II. In December 2018, Jacquees, on his Instagram profile, claimed to be the "king of R&B" for his generation, and this led to a strong controversy about it, escalating to a discussion in the urban world about who was the "king of R&B", with artists such as Snoop Dogg, Puff Daddy, Wiz Khalifa, 50 Cent, Bobby Brown and others publicly speaking out on the discussion, giving the "throne" to Chris Brown. American rapper Quavo, while talking to the singer, told him that the huge discussion sparked after his claim should've brought him to change the title of the album to King of R&B, and he decided to follow the rapper's advice.

The singer explained to Rolling Stone the title, as well as his statement saying:

Reception

The album received mainly positive reviews from critics. Charles Holmes of Rolling Stone praised the album for its sound, calling it one of the best albums of 2019. Exclaim!'''s  Mathias Pageau asserted that "Jacquees certainly has a beautiful voice", but "Listening to King of R&B, there is a sense that Jacquees tries hard to emulate his heroes, instead of letting himself be inspired by them". Andy Kellman of Pitchfork'' wrote positively of the album, stating that on the record Jacquees "even straddling the hip-hop world, he never loses the smoothness R&B requires. At a time when so many pride themselves on being genre-benders, he remains a formalist".

Charts

References

Jacquees albums
2019 albums
Cash Money Records albums
Republic Records albums